Trish Salah is an Arab Canadian poet, activist, and academic. She is the author of the poetry collections, Wanting in Arabic, published in 2002 by TSAR Publications and Lyric Sexology Vol. 1, published by Roof Books in 2014. An expanded Canadian edition of Lyric Sexology, Vol. 1 was published by Metonymy Press in 2017.

Biography 
Salah was born and raised in Halifax, Nova Scotia, and is of Lebanese and Irish Canadian heritage. She received her B.A. and M.A. in English and Creative Writing from Concordia University in Montreal, Quebec, and her Ph.D. in English Literature at York University in Toronto, Ontario. While a teaching assistant at York, Salah was politically active in the Canadian Union of Public Employees as the first transgender representative to their National Pink Triangle Committee. She is currently associate professor in the Department of Gender Studies at Queen's University, and prior to her appointment at Queen's, was faculty in Women's and Gender Studies at the University of Winnipeg.

Her creative and scholarly work addresses transgender and transsexual politics and experience, diasporic Arab identity and culture, anti-racism, queer politics and economic and social justice. Her poetry combines lyric and experimental forms.

The 2013 reissue of Wanting in Arabic won the Lambda Literary Award for Transgender Fiction at the 26th Lambda Literary Awards in 2014. In 2018, she was named a finalist for the Dayne Ogilvie Prize for Canadian LGBTQ writers.

Selected works

Books

Lyric Sexology, Vol. I. New York: Roof Books, 2014. (Second edition: Montreal, Metonymy Press, 2017.)

Wanting In Arabic: Poems. Toronto: Tsar Publications, 2002. (Second edition: Toronto, Mawenzi House, 2013.)

Edited volumes
Arc Poetry Magazine, "Polymorphous per Verse: Special Issue on Trans, Two Spirit and Non-Binary Writers." Co-edited with Ali Blythe. 94 (Winter 2021).

TSQ: Transgender Studies Quarterly. "Special Issue on Trans Cultural Production." Co-edited with Julian B. Carter and David J. Getsy. 1.4 (2014).

Canadian Review of American Studies. "Special Issue on Anne Marie MacDonald's Fall on Your Knees." Co-edited with Sara Matthews and Dina Georgis. 35.2 (2005).

Journal articles 
"What Does Tiresias Want?" TSQ: Transgender Studies Quarterly. "Psychoanalysis and Trans Studies." 4.4 (Fall 2017): 632–638.

"'Time Isn't After Us': Some Tiresian Durations." Special Issue on Trans Temporalities. Somatechnics 7.1 (March 2017): 16-33.

"Backlash to the Future: Re/Inscribing Transsexuality as Fundamentalism." Topia: Canadian Journal of Cultural Studies, 25 (Spring 2011): 212–222.

"In Lieu of a Transgender Poetics." Contemporary Feminist Poetics in Canada. Ed. Kate Eichorn and Barbara Godard. Spec. Issue of Open Letter. 13.9 (Summer 2009): 34–6.

"After Cissexual Poetry." Contemporary Queer Poetics. Ed. Julian Brolaski. Spec. Issue of Aufgabe: Journal of Poetry. 8 (Summer 2009): 282–298.

Book chapters 
"Returning to Schreber: Trans Literature as Psychoanalysis." Current Critical Debates in the Field of Transsexual Studies. Oren Gozlan, ed. New York: Routledge, 2018: 169–180.

"Reflections on Trans Organizing, Trade Unionism and Radical Communities." Trans Activism in Canada: A Reader. Dan Irving and Rupert Raj, eds. Toronto: Canadian Scholar's Press, 2014: 149–167.

"From Fans to Activists: Popular Feminism enlists in 'The War on Terror'." Muslim Women, Transnational Feminism and the Ethics of Pedagogy: Contested Imaginaries in post-9/11 Cultural Practice. Lisa Taylor and Jasmin Zine, eds. Routledge, 2014: 152–71.

"Working for Change: Sex Workers in the Union Struggle." with J. Clamen and K. Gillies. Selling Sex: Canadian Academics, Advocates and Sex Workers in Dialogue. Emily van der Meulen, Elya M. Durisin, and Victoria Love eds. Vancouver: University of British Columbia Press, 2013: 113–129.
 
"Notes Towards Thinking Transsexual Institutional Poetics." Trans/acting Culture, Writing and Memory: Essays in Honour of Barbara Godard. Eva C. Karpinski, Jennifer Henderson, Ian Sowton, and Ray Ellenwood, eds. Waterloo: Wilfrid Laurier Press: 2013: 167–189.

"An-Identity Poetics and Feminist Artist-Run Centers/La poétique de l'anidentité et les centres d'artistes féministes autogérés." Féminismes électriques. Leila Pourtavaf, ed. Montreal: Les Éditions du remue-ménage/ La Centrale Gallerie Powerhouse, 2012: 81–106.

References

External links
 Christy Davids interviews Trish Salah, February 10, 2017
 Écriture au Trans-féminine: Trish Salah's Wanting in Arabic, in Canadian Literature

Academic staff of Bishop's University
Canadian feminists
21st-century Canadian poets
Canadian women poets
Canadian people of Irish descent
Canadian people of Lebanese descent
Transgender women
Canadian transgender writers
Transfeminists
Writers from Nova Scotia
Writers from Halifax, Nova Scotia
Canadian Maronites
Year of birth missing (living people)
Living people
Academic staff of Concordia University
York University alumni
Canadian LGBT poets
Lambda Literary Award winners
21st-century Canadian women writers
Transgender academics
Transgender studies academics
Transgender poets
21st-century Canadian LGBT people
Canadian LGBT academics